is a Japanese professional footballer who plays as a defender for Ventforet Kofu, on the J2 League, the Japanese second-tier league.

He played at Kashiwa Reysol youth teams from 2007 to 2021, developing him, and observing him closely since childhood. He was also the captain for the Reysol's Under-18 team.  However, his professional contract would come in 2022 with Ventforet Kofu, and he signed with them to play for the club in the first-team. He made his debut for Ventforet Kofu on 15 May 2022 against Renofa Yamaguchi on the J2 League, being subbed on the 88th minute of the match. On 1 June 2022, less than one month since his J2 League debut, he earned his first match as a starter for Ventforet Kofu, in a Emperor's Cup tie against International Pacific University in the second round of the competition, playing the full 90 minutes in a Kofu's 5–1 win.

Career statistics

Club

References

External links
 Profile at jleague.jp
 Profile at Ventforet Kofu

2003 births
Living people
Japanese footballers
Association football defenders
J2 League players
Ventforet Kofu players